Lord Evans may refer to:

 Ifor Evans, Baron Evans of Hungershall (1899–1982), academic
 Horace Evans, 1st Baron Evans (1903–1963), physician
 Gruffydd Evans, Baron Evans of Claughton (1928–1992), solicitor and politician
 John Evans, Baron Evans of Parkside (1930–2016), politician
 Matthew Evans, Baron Evans of Temple Guiting (1941–2016), politician
 David Evans, Baron Evans of Watford (born 1942), publisher, entrepreneur and philanthropist
 Jonathan Evans, Baron Evans of Weardale (born 1958), former Director General of MI5
 Graham Evans, Baron Evans of Rainow (born 1963), politician

See also
 Natalie Evans, Baroness Evans of Bowes Park (born 1975), Leader of the House of Lords
 Baron Mountevans